Ever Since Darwin is a 1977 book by the paleontologist Stephen Jay Gould. Gould's first book of collected essays, it originated from his monthly column "This View of Life," published in Natural History magazine. Edwin Barber—who was then the editorial director for W. W. Norton & Company— encouraged Gould to produce a book. He soon commissioned Gould to write The Mismeasure of Man, but it was not until three years later, when Gould accumulated 33 columns, that it occurred to either of them that the Natural History columns should be published in a single volume. The collection of essays, written between 1973–1977, became a best-seller and propelled Gould to national prominence.

Reviews
 James Gorman, "The History of a Theory", The New York Times, 20 November 1977.
 Richard Dawkins, "Rejoicing in Multifarious Nature. Review of Ever Since Darwin by S. J. Gould", reprinted in The Devil's Chaplain: Selected Essays, Phoenix, 2003.

External links
W.W.Norton Promotional page

References 

1977 non-fiction books
American essay collections
Books about Charles Darwin
Books by Stephen Jay Gould
English-language books
Works originally published in Natural History (magazine)
W. W. Norton & Company books